A falling-film column (or wetted-wall column) is a particular chemical equipment used to achieve mass and heat transfer between two fluid phases (in general one gas phase and one liquid phase).

It is essentially formed by a vertical tube-shaped vessel: the liquid stream flows through the inner wall of the tube and the gas stream flows in correspondence of the centre of the tube.

Description 

In the most common case, the column contains one liquid stream and one gas stream. The liquid forms a thin film that covers the inner surface of the vessel, instead the gas stream is normally injected from the bottom of the column, so the two fluids are subjected to a counter-current exchange of matter and heat, that happens in correspondence of the gas-liquid interface.

Sometimes, the same equipment is used to achieve the co-current mass and heat transfer between two immiscible liquids.

Applications 

Because of its easiness of modelling, falling-film column is generally used as laboratory equipment, for example to measure experimentally the values of transport coefficients. A significant experiment was carried out in 1934 by Edwin R. Gilliland and Thomas Kilgore Sherwood that used a falling-film column to study the mass transfer phenomenon between a liquid phase and a gas phase, obtaining an experimental correlation between Sherwood number, Reynolds number and Schmidt number.

It is not used at an industrial scale, because it has low surface area and liquid hold-up compared to other gas-liquid contactors (e.g. a packed column or a plate column).

References 

Chemical equipment